-hay (also hays, hayes, etc.) is a place-name word-ending common in England. It derives from the Old English word hege or haga, Middle English heie, in Icelandic hagi, meaning "an enclosed 
field", and is from the same root as the English word "hedge", a structure which surrounds and encloses an area of land, from the Norman-French haie, "a hedge". Haw (from O.E. haga) and Hay (from O.E. hege) are cognate and both 
mean "hedge".

Examples
Cheslyn Hay, Walsall, meaning "a fenced or hedged enclosure",  here perhaps around an ancient cromlech or burial-mound. 
Pipe Hayes ("hedges"), Erdington.

Derbyshire
The Findern Hays

Devon

Exeter
In the vicinity of Exeter:
Floyer Hayes
Northern Hay
Southern Hay
 Shill Hay
Fryers Hay
 Bon Hay
 Princesshay

Tiverton
In the vicinity of Tiverton:
Moor Hayes, Cullompton
 Passmore Hayes
 Buck Hayes
 Rashleigh Hayes
 Gorn Hay
 Wid Hayes
 Moor Hayes, Washfield

See also
Hayes (surname), sometimes derived from this topological source

Sources
Johnston, Rev. James B., The Place-Names of England and Wales, London, 1915, p. 147

References

Hay
Infixes
English suffixes